Birders in Canada and the United States refer to several families of long-legged wading birds in semi-aquatic ecosystems as waders. These include the families Phoenicopteridae (flamingos), Ciconiidae (storks), Threskiornithidae (ibises and spoonbills), Ardeidae (herons, egrets, and bitterns), and the extralimital families Scopidae (hamerkop) and Balaenicipitidae (shoebill) of Africa. Elsewhere in the world, the word refers to what North Americans call a "shorebird", various families of the order Charadriiformes. In the past all of these families were classified in the order Ciconiiformes based on overall similarity in anatomy and ecology, as well as some molecular data. However recent genomic studies have found that this group to be polyphyletic, with flamingos being more closely related to grebes while ibises, herons, the hamerkop and the shoebill are more closely related to pelicans. As a result of these changes flamingos are placed in their own order Phoenicopteriformes and Ciconiiformes are solely restricted to the storks. The rest of the waders have been reclassified into the order Pelecaniformes.

In some field guides, the families Gruidae (cranes) and Aramidae (limpkin) are also considered to be waders too. However unlike the previously mentioned families, cranes and the limpkin were never thought to be closely to the heron-like birds and have always been classified as members of the order Gruiformes.

References

Bird common names
Neognathae